Piras is a surname. Notable people with the surname include:

Annalisa Piras, Italian film director and journalist
Bernard Piras (1942–2016), French politician
Mattia Piras (born 1992), Italian footballer
Mikki Piras, American slalom canoeist
Nicola Piras (born 1991), Italian footballer
Raffaele Piras (1942-2014), Italian long jumper
Sebastian Piras, Italian photographer
It can also mean
Piras (mythology)

Surnames of Italian origin